Taraiya Assembly constituency is an assembly constituency in Saran district in the Indian state of Bihar. Taraiya city has the highest Siva temple in Bihar. There, Vidhan sabha constituency consists of neighboring blocks such as Isuapur, and Mashrakh Panapur.

Overview
As per Delimitation of Parliamentary and Assembly constituencies Order, 2008, No. 116 Taraiya Assembly constituency is composed of the following:Taraiya, Panapur and Ishuapur community development blocks. Panchayat are following: Dumari, Chanchaliya, Madhopur, Chainpur  etc.

Taraiya Assembly constituency is part of No. 19 Maharajganj (Lok Sabha constituency). It was earlier part of Chapra (Lok Sabha constituency).

Members of Legislative Assembly

Election results

2020

References

External links
 

Assembly constituencies of Bihar
Politics of Saran district